Manuel Hartl (born 31 December 1985) is an Austrian footballer who currently plays as a midfielder for WSC Hertha Wels.

External links
 

1985 births
Living people
Austrian footballers
FC Juniors OÖ players
SC Schwanenstadt players
SC Wiener Neustadt players
FC Lustenau players
SV Horn players
SKN St. Pölten players
FC Blau-Weiß Linz players
Austrian Football Bundesliga players
2. Liga (Austria) players
Austrian Regionalliga players

Association football midfielders